Idiomarina indica is a Gram-negative, aerobic and rod-shaped bacterium from the genus of Idiomarina which has been isolated from seawater from the Indian Ocean.

References

External links
Type strain of Idiomarina indica at BacDive -  the Bacterial Diversity Metadatabase

Bacteria described in 2013
Alteromonadales